LeVelle DeShea Moton (born June 16, 1974) is an American college basketball coach and the current head coach of the men's basketball team at North Carolina Central University.  He was a former player at North Carolina Central, having graduated in 1996.

Early life 
Moton was born in Boston, Massachusetts on June 16, 1974.  He and his older brother Earl were raised in the Orchard Park housing projects, the same projects as R&B group New Edition. His mother and grandmother raised LeVelle and his brother in the rough era of the crack epidemic. One time, as a youth, Moton attempted to sell drugs to provide for his family, a local druglord told other dealers he would punish them if they hired Moton. Hattie, his mother, decided to move her sons out of Boston to try and give them a better life and moved to Raleigh, North Carolina. Moton attended Daniels Middle School, where his jersey is retired, and went on to play at Enloe High School. He and his family lived in Lane Street projects which was right down the street from the Boys Club of Raleigh. Moton started attending the Boys Club and credits it with being one of the things that saved his life and kept him off the streets. There, he encountered Ron Williams, who became a father figure to him.  For over 30 years Coach Williams has been an intimate part of Moton's life.  Serving as a mentor, advisor and friend, Coach Williams and  the Boys Club were a refuge for Moton and many other youth in the neighborhood, including future NBA star PJ Tucker.

High school 
He was a three-year letter-winner (1989–92) under head coach Frank Williams. Named All-Conference ('90-'92), All-State ('92), Cap5 Player of the Year ('92), Triangle Player for the Year ('92), and McDonalds's All-American Honorable Mention ('92). Two-time Conference Champions.   (89–90) As a sophomore, averaged 11.2 points and 5.0 rebounds per game. Tallied game high 23 points versus Apex High. (90–91) As a junior, averaged 23.1 points and 6.0 rebounds per contest. Scored game-high 38 points against Millbrook. (91–92)As a senior, averaged 29.4 points and 7.0 rebounds per game. Racked-up game high 51 points versus Cary High School.

College 
From 1992–1996 Moton was a standout player at North Carolina Central University in Durham, North Carolina.  In 1996, he graduated from NCCU with a bachelor's degree in recreation administration.  Moton became the school's third all-time leading scorer with 1,714 points during his historic hardwood career as an Eagle from 1992–96, earning the nickname "Poetry 'n Moton."

During his junior and senior seasons, Moton was voted All-CIAA First Team, NCAA Division II South Atlantic All-Region First Team and NCAA Division II All-America Honorable Mention. He was named the 1996 CIAA (Central Intercollegiate Athletic Association) Men's Basketball Player of the Year and was inducted into the NCCU Athletics Hall of Fame in 2004.

Among NCCU's all-time career leaders, Moton ranks first in 3-point field goals made (213 of 529), third in scoring (1,714 points), fourth in free throws made (363 of 467), fifth in assists (278), eighth in field goals made (569 of 1,159), 10th in scoring average (16.6 points per game), and 11th in steals (110).

As a junior (1994–95), he topped the CIAA and was No. 16 in NCAA Division II in scoring with an average of 23.5 points per game. His 87 made three-point field goals that year broke the school's single-season record. As a senior (1995–96), he placed second in the CIAA with 21.3 points per game and ranked among the conference's top 10 statistical leaders in assists, free throw percentage and 3-point field goal percentage.

Moton played on three CIAA Southern Division Championship teams and made two trips to the NCAA playoffs, including an NCAA Division II South Atlantic Regional Championship title in 1993. During his NCCU playing career, his teams racked up an 80-28 record, which included three 20-win seasons.

Professional career 
After NCCU, Moton played four years of professional basketball in Indonesia (1996–97) and Israel (1998–99). Throughout his professional playing career, Moton averaged 25.0 points per contest, and dished out a little more than five assists per game as a pro.

Coaching career 
On March 25, 2009, arguably one of the greatest players in school history was elevated from assistant coach to the position of head coach, becoming the 17th to be named in that spot in the program's history.

During the 2016–17 season Moton led the Eagles to a 25–9 overall record and a 13-3 MEAC mark, and he joined rare company with John B. McLendon as the only coaches with four 20-win seasons at NCCU.  NCCU captured its third MEAC regular-season championship and second MEAC Tournament championship within a four-year span to make its second Division-I NCAA Tournament appearance.  The Eagles also made history with their first win over an SEC opponent with a wire-to-wire 62–52 win at Missouri.  NCCU went on a 13-game win streak during conference play, the second-longest win streak in the Division-I era.  The Eagles continued to pride itself on defense by being second in the nation in three-point defense, allowing just 29.0 percent made attempts. NCCU was also top-10 in field goal percentage defense (39.1), top-25 in scoring defense (63.4 points per game) and top-15 in scoring margin (11.7 points per game).

Close to 25 years after the magical run of the 1989 NCAA Division II National Championship team, and just 10 days shy of the fifth anniversary of the day of his official hiring, NCCU soared to its first MEAC tournament championship on March 15, 2014 following its 71–62 victory over Morgan State in front of a near-capacity crowd inside the Norfolk Scope Arena.  The 2013–14 Eagles tied a school record in wins (28), won the most games in a season for any squad in MEAC history, and was the lowest seed for any league champion in the NCAA Tournament as the maroon and gray earned a 14-seed in the East Region.  Moton's squad finished 15–1 in conference play earning the school's first Division I regular season title and won 20 straight contests, which set a new NCAA Division I level record for the program.

With the rings of a champion came the accolades as Moton earned MEAC Coach of the Year honors, MEAC Tournament's Most Outstanding Coach award, and was named the BoxtoRow.com HBCU National Coach of the Year, while earning finalist spots in the Hugh Durham National Coach of the Year Award (Top-Mid-Major Coach), and the Top Minority Coach honor, the Ben Jobe National Coach of the Year Award.

The following year, his sixth season as head coach at NCCU, Moton guided the 2014–15 Eagles to a 25–8 overall record, including a 19–3 mark during the final three-and-a-half months, as well as the school's first appearance in the National Invitation Tournament. The 2014–15 squad made history by becoming the first men's basketball team in school history to post an unbeaten regular-season conference record at 16–0 to repeat as MEAC regular-season champions. The Eagles were among the top five defenses in Division I, ranking second in field goal percentage defense (behind Kentucky), fourth in three-point field goal percentage defense and fifth in scoring defense. NCCU completed the campaign by extending the second-longest home win streak in Division I at 35 victories in-a-row (behind Arizona).  Moton joined hall of fame coach John McLendon and national championship coach Michael Bernard as the only coaches in NCCU men's basketball history to lead the Eagles to three straight 20-win seasons. As a credit to the program's recent success, NCCU boasts the best regular-season conference record during the last three seasons at 46–2, a winning percentage of .958.

The maroon and gray's second season in the MEAC, Moton's fourth, was the coming out party for the program. For the first time at the NCAA Division I level, the Eagles won 20 games finishing the year 22-9, and went 15–1 in conference play to earn the No. 2 seed in the conference tournament. In fact, the program experienced only two losses in the calendar year of 2013. The 22 victories were the most since his freshman year of 1992–93 when NCCU finished 26–4. The 11-game winning streak was the longest since the 1995–96 campaign when NCCU won 16-in-a-row. Moton earned national praise by being named a finalist for the Ben Jobe National Coach of the Year Award, and the Hugh Durham National Coach of the Year of Award, along with Co-Coach of the Year in the MEAC by CollegeInsider.com.

In his third season in charge of the North Carolina Central University basketball program, Moton took his team to a place not since seen since the 2004-05 season when the Eagles finished with a winning record (17–15) and were seeded fifth in their first MEAC Tournament at the Division I level. Of the 215 schools that have reclassified to the NCAA Division I level, NCCU was one of 38 schools across the nation who finished their first official season with 17 wins or more. That puts the Eagles in the same company as (Air Force–1958, VCU–1974, Weber State–1964, George Mason–1979, UNLV–1970, James Madison–1977, and Northwestern State (La.)–1997) who also recorded 17 wins in its inaugural campaign.

His second year at the helm his squad showed the Eagle Nation how bright the future was as his squad racked up 15 wins and recorded the first non-losing season in nearly six years. His record against MEAC opponents during the regular season was 10–5 which would have placed the maroon and gray as the number two seed in the league tournament. He earned NCAA Division I Independent Coach of the Year honors.

Year No. 1 was certainly a challenging one for Moton, but the program took numerous steps in the right direction. During the 2009-10 campaign, Moton led NCCU to its first winning record at home (7–4), its first Division I winning streak (three games), and gave numerous big-time opponents trouble throughout the season, but the second year head coach is nowhere near satisfied.

The Eagles finished 7–22, which included wins against soon-to-be conference foes Maryland Eastern Shore and Savannah State. The seven victories represented the most since making the move to Division I.

He initially returned to his alma mater as assistant men's basketball coach in July 2007.

The NCCU Athletics Hall-of-Famer joined the NCCU staff after serving as head boys basketball coach at Sanderson High School in his hometown of Raleigh, N.C. During his three-year tenure (2004–07) at Sanderson, Moton led the Spartans to an overall record of 59-25, while winning back-to-back Cap-7 tournament championships in 2006 and 2007.

Head coaching record

Personal 
Moton and his wife, Bridget, married on June 28, 2008. They have two children Brooke and LeVelle Jr.

Philanthropy 
Single Mother's Salute
The VelleCares foundation provides an annual event "Single Mother Salute". Each year, The Velle Cares Foundation honorsand celebrates over 100 Single Mothers each year across the Triangle Community. The event was created to show appreciation for the Struggles, Challenges, and Difficulties associated with being a Single Mother. Being the product of a Single Mother himself, LeVelle presents awards of Courage, Strength, Perseverance, and also a Single Mother of the Year award (named after his mother Hattie McDougald). The night is filled with photos, red carpet, food, games, spa treatments, gift bags, vacations, and many other exciting giveaways.

LeVelle Moton Back To School Community Day
Each year, LeVelle Moton, hosts his annual "Back to School Community Day Event" along with NBA Star PJ Tucker at The Raleigh Boys & Girls Club. The event serves over 700 kids and families each year by providing them with Book Bags, School Supplies, Give aways, and Entertainment. The number one step towards academic excellence is making sure students have the proper resources and This Community Day covers just that. This event provides a holistic approach for families and local community leaders attend and be actively involved. As a product of The Boys & Girls Club, LeVelle has donated his time and efforts into creating a platform of success for the next generation.

Coaching Awards 
 2016-17: NABC District 15 Coach of the Year
 2016-17: BoxToRow.com HBCU National Co-Coach of the Year
 2016-17: MEAC Coach of the Year
 2016-17: Finalist Hugh Durham National Coach of the Year Award (Top Mid-Major Coach)
 2016-17: Finalist Ben Jobe National Coach of the Year Award (Top Minority Coach)
 2016-17: MEAC tournament champions
 2016-17: MEAC Tournament (Most Outstanding Coach)
 2016-17: MEAC Regular Season Champions (13-3)
 2016-17: Two All-MEAC Selections (Player of the Year)
 2015-16: One All-MEAC Selection
 2014-15:  NABC District 15 Coach of the Year
 2014-15:  Finalist Hugh Durham National Coach of the Year Award (Top Mid-Major Coach)
 2014-15:  Finalist Ben Jobe National Coach of the Year Award (Top Minority Coach)
 2014-15:  MEAC Regular Season Champions (16-0)
 2014-15:  Five All-MEAC Selections
 2014-15:  Third consecutive 20-win season (25-8)
 2013-14:  Tied School record for single-season wins (28)
 2013-14:  Set MEAC Record for wins in a season (28)
 2013-14:  Finalist Hugh Durham National Coach of the Year Award (Top Mid-Major Coach)
 2013-14:  Finalist Ben Jobe National Coach of the Year Award (Top Minority Coach)
 2013-14:  BoxToRow.com HBCU National Coach of the Year
 2013-14:  CollegeInsider.com (MEAC Coach of the Year)
 2013-14:  MEAC Tournament (Most Outstanding Coach)
 2013-14:  MEAC Coach of the Year
 2013-14:  MEAC Regular Season Champions (15-1)
 2013-14:  Two All-MEAC Selections (Player of the Year)
 2013-14:  Back-to-Back 20-win seasons (25-5)
 2012-13:  First 20-win season since 1996-97 (22-9)
 2012-13:  Three All-MEAC Selections
 2012-13:  CollegeInsider.com MEAC Co-Coach of the Year
 2012-13:  Finalist Ben Jobe National Coach of the Year Award (Top Minority Coach)
 2012-13:  Finalist Hugh Durham National Coach of the Year Award (Top Mid-Major Coach)
 2011-12:  First winning season since 2004-05 (17-15)
 2011-12:  Two All-MEAC Selections
 2010-11:  NCAA Division I Independent Coach of the Year

References 
2. nccueaglepride.com

3. nccueagelpride.com

1974 births
Living people
American men's basketball coaches
American men's basketball players
Basketball coaches from Massachusetts
Basketball players from Boston
College men's basketball head coaches in the United States
High school basketball coaches in the United States
North Carolina Central Eagles men's basketball coaches
North Carolina Central Eagles men's basketball players
Sportspeople from Boston
William G. Enloe High School alumni
Shooting guards